James Pedersen (November 5, 1868 – January 16, 1944) was an American businessman and politician.

Born in Denmark, Pedersen emigrated to the United States and settled in Marinette, Wisconsin in 1887. He was in the wholesale fish business. Pedersen served on the Marinette Common Council. He also served on the Marinette Harbor Commission and the Marinette Fire and Police Commission. During World War I, Pedersen was an agent for the Public Service Reserve for Marinette County, Wisconsin. Pedersen served in the Wisconsin State Assembly in 1919 and 1923 and was a Republican. Pedersen died in a hospital in Marinette, Wisconsin after being in ill health.

Notes

1868 births
1944 deaths
Danish emigrants to the United States
People from Marinette, Wisconsin
Businesspeople from Wisconsin
Wisconsin city council members
Republican Party members of the Wisconsin State Assembly